Alternariol is a toxic metabolite of Alternaria fungi. It is an important contaminant in cereals and fruits.
Alternariol exhibits antifungal and phytotoxic activity. It is reported to  inhibit cholinesterase enzymes. It is also a mycoestrogen.

Alternariol is reported to be a full androgen agonist in an in vitro assay.

References 

Mycotoxins
Natural phenols
Benzochromenes
Lactones
Resorcinols
Mycoestrogens